Babak Azizzadeh, MD, FACS is the founder and president of the FPBPF (Facial Paralysis & Bells Palsy Foundation), a non-profit organization committed to the treatment of individuals with facial nerve paralysis and Bell's palsy.

Dr. Azizzadeh is co-director of the facial plastic and reconstructive surgery fellowship at the Keck School of Medicine at the University of Southern California and co-chairman of the Cedars-Sinai Medical Center Annual Advances in Multispecialty Aesthetic and Reconstructive Surgery Symposium. Besides his role in FPBPF, Dr. Azizzadeh is involved with several other non-profit / charity organizations such as the Global Smile Foundation, Operation of Hope, Face to Face and the R.O.S.E Fund. Azizzadeh is among the few surgeons in the US who perform repair of facial paralysis.

Early life and education
Azizzadeh undertook his medical education at the David Geffen School of Medicine at UCLA.

He did his surgical training at the Harvard Medical School, Cedars-Sinai Medical Center, and David Geffen School of Medicine at UCLA.

Career
Azizzadeh is a Facial Plastic and Reconstructive Surgeon, board-certified by the American Board of Facial Plastic and Reconstructive Surgery and the American Board of Otolaryngology–Head and Neck Surgery. Azizzadeh co-owns La Peer Health Systems, a medical organization specializing in various fields including plastic and reconstructive surgery. He specializes in facial rejuvenation, rhinoplasty, blepharoplasty, non-surgical enhancements, facial paralysis and facial reconstruction. In addition, he is an Assistant Clinical Professor of Surgery at the David Geffen School of Medicine at UCLA. Dr. Azizzadeh is a Facial Plastic Surgery Fellowship Program Director at the American Academy of Facial Plastic and Reconstructive Surgery.

Azizzadeh is affiliated to the following institutes and organizations:
Co-director, American Academy of Facial Plastic and Reconstructive Surgery.
Member, Micro-vascular committee, American Academy of Otolaryngology–Head and Neck Surgery
Fellow of the American College of Surgeons
American Medical Association
California Society of Facial Plastic Surgery
California Medical Association
Los Angeles County Medical Association
Los Angeles Society of Otolaryngology - Head and Neck Surgery
Alpha Omega Alpha Honor Medical Society
Phi Beta Kappa
Sir Charles Bell Society

Philanthropy
Azizzadeh has won accolades for his voluntarism and humanitarian efforts. He is the founder and president of the Facial Paralysis & Bell's Palsy Foundation, which treats patients with complicated cases of facial nerve paralysis and Bell's palsy. He has also worked with the UCLA Flying Samaritans. He is also a member of various charity ventures such as the Global Smile Foundation, Operation of Hope, Face to Face, and the R.O.S.E. Fund.

Media appearances
Azizzadeh performed successful corrective surgery for Mary Jo Buttafuoco, who was shot in her face by Amy Fisher. The surgery was documented by media across the United States; he appeared on The Oprah Winfrey Show during May 2005, explaining the surgery along with his patient, Buttafuoco. The same year, he appeared on the Entertainment Tonight with the same patient. His work in Zimbabwe was covered by the People magazine. His Cosmetic Cocktail treatment regimen was also covered by the US media. In 2009, Azizzadeh appeared on the Discovery Health Channel explaining revision rhinoplasty.

Publications

Master Techniques in Facial Rejuvenation with Mark Murphy, MD and Calvin Johnson, MD. Saunders, (2nd). 2006.
Master Techniques in Rhinoplasty with Mark R. Murphy, MD, Calvin M. Johnson Jr., MD and William Numa, MD, FACS. Saunders, 2011. (1st) pp. 520. .
Master Techniques in Blepharoplasty and Periorbital Rejuvenation with Guy G. Massry, MD Guy G.,Mark R. Murphy, MD Mark R., 2011. pp. 342. 
Beverly Hills Beauty Secrets with Douglas Hamilton, MD. Wiley, (1st). 2007. pp. 272. .
Inhibiton of Nitric Oxide Inhibitors Promote Microvascular Thrombosis with Larian B, Buga GM, Berke GS, Ignarro LJ, and Blackwell KE. 
Griffin G, Azizzadeh B, Massry GG. New insights into physical findings associated with postblepharoplasty lower eyelid retraction. Aesthetic Surgery Journal. 2014 Sep 1;34(7):995-1004. . .
Yoo DB, Azizzadeh B, Massry GG. Injectable 5-FU with or without added steroid in periorbital skin grafting: initial observations. Ophthalmic Plastic & Reconstructive Surgery. 2015 Mar 1;31(2):122-6. . .
Yoo DB, Peng GL, Azizzadeh B, Nassif PS. Microbiology and antibiotic prophylaxis in rhinoplasty: a review of 363 consecutive cases. JAMA Facial Plastic Surgery. 2015 Jan 1;17(1):23-7. . .
Kadakia S, Helman SN, Schwedhelm T, Saman M, Azizzadeh B. Examining the genetics of congenital facial paralysis—a 21 closer look at Moebius syndrome. Oral and Maxillofacial Surgery. 2015 Jun 1;19(2):109-16. . .
Kadakia S, Saman M, Smith M, Azizzadeh B. The gracilis free flap in head and neck reconstruction: a historical overview of uses outside of facial reanimation. Journal of Craniofacial Surgery. 2015 Jul 1;26(5):1724-6. . .
Braz A, Humphrey S, Weinkle S, Yee GJ, Remington BK, Lorenc ZP, Yoelin S, Waldorf HA, Azizzadeh B, Butterwick KJ, de Maio M. Lower face: clinical anatomy and regional approaches with injectable fillers. Plastic and Reconstructive Surgery. 2015 Nov 1;136(5S):235S-57S. . .
Durand PD, Couto RA, Isakov R, Yoo DB, Azizzadeh B, Guyuron B, Zins JE. Botulinum Toxin and Muscle Atrophy: A Wanted or Unwanted Effect. Aesthetic Surgery Journal. 2016 Apr 1;36(4):482-7. . .
Sinha KR, Rootman DB, Azizzadeh B, Goldberg RA. Association of Eyelid Position and Facial Nerve Palsy With Unresolved Weakness. JAMA Facial Plastic Surgery. 2016 Sep 1;18(5):379-84. . .
Banks CA, Jowett N, Azizzadeh B, Beurskens C, Bhama P, Borschel G, Coombs C, Coulson S, Croxon G, Diels J, Fattah A. Worldwide Testing of the eFACE Facial Nerve Clinician- Graded Scale. Plastic and Reconstructive Surgery. 2017 Feb 1;139(2):491e-8e. . .
Kossler AL, Peng GL, Yoo DB, Azizzadeh B, Massry GG. Current Trends in Upper and Lower Eyelid Blepharoplasty Among American Society of Ophthalmic Plastic and Reconstructive Surgery Members. Ophthalmic Plastic and Reconstructive Surgery. 2017 Feb 1. . .
Slattery WH, Azizzadeh B, editors. The Facial Nerve. Thieme, 2014.
Azizzadeh B, editor. (1st) Rhinoplasty: A Multispecialty Approach, An Issue of Clinics in Plastic Surgery. Elsevier, 2015. 
Larian B, Azizzadeh B, editors. Comprehensive Management of Parotid Disorders. Otolaryngologic Clinics of North America. 2016 Apr;49(2):xv. . .
Azizzadeh B, Murphy MR, Johnson CM, Massry GG, Fitzgerald R, editors. Master Techniques in Facial Rejuvenation, Second Edition. WB Saunders, pp. 358. .
Griffin G, Azizzadeh B. Rhytidectomy. In Facial Surgery: Plastic and Reconstructive 2014 Dec 2 pp. 857–881. CRC Press.
Undavia S, Azizzadeh B. Rhytidectomy in Dark-Skinned Patients. Ethnic Considerations in Facial Plastic Surgery. 2015 Dec 16.
Griffin GR, Azizzadeh B. Masseteric-Facial Anastomosis for Dynamic Lower Eyelid Reanimation in Facial Paralysis. In Pearls and Pitfalls in Cosmetic Oculoplastic Surgery. 2015. (pp. 621–624). Springer New York.
Azizzadeh B, Lee KJ. Lower Facial Reanimation. In Slattery WH, Azizzadeh B. editors The Facial Nerve. Thieme, 2014.
Azizzadeh B, Kulbersh JS, O’Connell BP. Examination of the Facial Nerve. In Slattery WH, Azizzadeh B. Editors The Facial Nerve. Thieme, 2014.

References

External links
The Facial Paralysis Institute
CENTER for Advanced Facial Plastic Surgery

Living people
American plastic surgeons
American people of Iranian descent
David Geffen School of Medicine at UCLA alumni
Harvard Medical School alumni
American otolaryngologists
David Geffen School of Medicine at UCLA faculty
Fellows of the American College of Surgeons
Year of birth missing (living people)